The Language Movement in Manbhum was a movement in Manbhum district, present day Purulia district of West Bengal state, during the late 1940s to mid-1950s, to fight for their mother tongue, Bengali language and to protest the introduction of the Hindi language in West Bengal.

Background 
In 1765, the nominal Mughal Emperor Shah Alam II was defeated to the British East India Company in the Battle of Buxar. He granted "Diwani" (right to collect revenue) of Bengal (which included Bihar) to the East India Company. The East India Company started Tax-Collection process in the Jungal Mahal area. To have a greater Control over the area, East India Company split the area into smaller districts like Panchet (1773), Jungle-Mahal (1805) and Manbhum (1833). The Manbhum District was formed with an area of 20,450.5 square kilometres (7,896 square miles). The district of Manbhum was again split in 1845, 1846, 1871 and finally in 1879, and as a result the area of Manbhum was reduced to 10,650 square kilometres (4,112 square miles).

The Partition of Bengal was started in 1905, and, as an effect of that, a new state, Bihar-Odisha, was formed. The Manbhum District was included to the Bihar-Odisha. The whole district started protesting against the inclusion. The language movement or Bhasa Andolon had started as a demand to include Manbhum District as a part of Bengal.

Early days of movement 
At the time of independence of India in 1947, Manbhum district was a part of Bihar. From 1948 Bengali speaking peoples of Manbhum district started suffering as restrictions on Bengali language as well as forcible imposition of Hindi language over Bengali speaking people had started. Bengali officers of Manbhum district were transferred to the others districts of Bihar, D.I. of school issued notice to teach Hindi from Primary classes, Bengali department was closed in zilla school. Installation of notice board in Hindi language become Compulsory for the schools and business establishment. Presenting the Domicile Certificate became mandatory for the Bengalis of Manbhum District. Hindi was declared as official language of Manbhum District.

The Movement 
After seeing the plight of Bengali speaking people, a proposal to make the Bengali as the language of Manbhum district has given. But it was defeated in 43–55 at the Congress Party on 30 May 1948. On 14 June 1948 the Lok Sevak Sangha was established to protect Bengali Language as well as to fight for forcible imposition of Hindi Language over the Bengali Language as the state policy of the then Bihar government. The government restricted the use of Bengali language in education to the Bengali speaking people of Manbhum District. The government banned rallies also. All these incident sparked the protest to the fullest in Manbhum District.

Lok Sevak Sangha started the agitation in various level.

 Satyagraha Andolan (Non-violent agitation) (1949–1951)
 Hal Joal Andolan
 Tusu Satyagraha Andolan (9 Jan – 8 Feb 1954)
  
Thousands of Bengali people of Manbhum district protested with the song written by Bhajahari Mahato and forced to jail. 
''Shun Bihari-bhai,
Tora Rakhte Narbi
Dang Dekhai… … 
Translation:
O Bihari-brothers
You cannot keep us in Bihar
Showing sticks… …
The Bar association, Purulia Municipality and Communist party also joined this agitation.

Post Movement Effect 
As an effect of this agitation a commission named "State Reorganization Commission" was set up by the Central government on 23 December 1953. The Commission held hearing in Manbhum district on 5 February 1955 and submitted its report on 10 October 1955. In its report the commission proposed the formation of a new district "Purulia", primarily dominated by Bengali speaking people to West Bengal from erstwhile Manbhum district of Bihar.The new Purulia district comprised 19 Police stations from the then Manbhum district. But as a Special request from TISCO the then Chief minister of West Bengal, Dr. Bidhan Chndra Roy gave consent for accession of three police stations (Patamda, Ichagarh and Chandil) to the Bihar. After bifurcation of Bihar, those three region became part of Jharkhand state.

On 1 November 1956 with 16 Police stations, 2007 square mile area and with a population of  the new district Purulia was acceded to West Bengal.

See also
 Bengali language movement in India
 Bengali language movement in Bangladesh
 Labanya Prabha Ghosh

References 

Language conflict in India
Linguistic rights
Purulia district
History of West Bengal (1947–present)
Bengali language